The Notebooks of Memory is the third documentary film in a trilogy by Anne Aghion examining the aftermath of the Rwandan genocide.

Synopsis
Anne Aghion's third film in her Rwanda series concentrates on the local citizen-judges' tribunals, where they must weigh survivor accounts of the genocide massacres against the perpetrators' testimony.

On a lush Rwandan hillside, more than ten years after the 1994 genocide directed at wiping out the Tutsi population, a tiny rural community repeatedly meet on the grass for the Gacaca court trials, a judicial experiment aimed at bringing unity back to the country. Award-winning filmmaker Anne Aghion spent four years chronicling the trials, where perpetrators would barter confessions for shorter jail sentences.

References

External links
 Official website

French documentary films
Documentary films about the Rwandan genocide
Films directed by Anne Aghion
Kinyarwanda-language films
2009 films
2009 documentary films
2000s French films